Isenburg may refer to:

Places
 Neu-Isenburg, town in the district of Offenbach in Hesse, Germany
 Isenburg, Rhineland-Palatinate, municipality in the district of Neuwied, Germany
 , village in the borough of Wipperfürth in Oberbergischen Kreis in North Rhine-Westphalia, Germany
 Isenburg (Horb), village in the borough of Horb in the district of Freudenstadt, Baden-Württemberg, Germany

Territories, castles and palaces
 County of Isenburg, a territorial lordship that was ruled by the lords, counts and princes of Isenburg
 , castle near Hattingen in North Rhine-Westphalia, Germany
 , castle in Cologne, Germany
 , castle in Isenburg near Dierdorf in the Westerwald forest, Germany
 , castle near Essen in North Rhine-Westphalia, Germany
 Isenburg (Saxony), castle between Hartenstein and Wildbach, Germany
  in Offenbach am Main, Germany
 , former circular rampart site near Landringhausen, borough of Barsinghausen, Germany

People
 a Rhenish aristocratic family, see County of Isenburg
  (1460–1522), German noblewoman
 Arnold II of Isenburg (died 1259), Archbishop of Trier
 Diether von Isenburg (1412–1482), German priest, Archbishop of Mainz (1459–1462 and 1475–1482)
 Ernst Graf von Isenburg (1584-1664), Spanish general in the Thirty Years War
  (1900–1974), President of the Stille Hilfe relief organisation
 Wilhelm Karl Prinz zu Isenburg (1903–1956), German genealogist

See also
 Isenburg-Büdingen, a former county of southern Hesse, Germany